Minor Counties West played in List A cricket matches between 1976 and 1978. This is a list of the players who appeared in those matches.

Raymond Bailey (1978): RR Bailey
Alan Burridge (1976–1978): AJ Burridge
Brian Collins (1976–1978): BG Collins
Francis Collyer (1976–1978): FE Collyer
Richard Cooper (1976): RC Cooper
David Daniels (1977): DM Daniels
Micky Dunn (1976–1977): MT Dunn
Malcolm Dunstan (1977–1978): MST Dunstan
Keith Edwards (1976): JKS Edwards
Peter Gooch (1978): PA Gooch
Richard Gulliver (1976): RJ Gulliver
Brian Jeffries (1978): BR Jeffries
Robin Johns (1977): RL Johns
David Johnston (1976): D Johnston
Gwynne Jones (1976): GA Jones
Keith Jones (1976–1977): KV Jones
Peter Lewington (1978): PJ Lewington
Richard Lewis (1978): RV Lewis
Bill Merry (1978): WG Merry
Mike Nurton (1977–1978): MD Nurton
Wayne Osman (1978): WM Osman
David Ottley (1976–1978): DG Ottley
John Turner (1976): JB Turner
Gary Wallen (1977–1978): G Wallen
Doug Yeabsley (1976–1978): DI Yeabsley

References

List
Minor Counties of English and Welsh cricket